Rizospilia (before 1927: Στρούζα - Strouza) is a mountain village and a community in the municipal unit Dimitsana, western Arcadia, Greece. The community of Rizospilia consists of the villages Rizospilia and Kato Rizospilia (former name Mikrochori). It is situated in a remote, mountainous area. It is 3 km northeast of the river Alfeios, 8 km southwest of Dimitsana, 10 km northeast of Andritsaina and 12 km northwest of Karytaina. The community Rizospilia had a population of 51 in 2011.

Population

Tourism
South-east of Rizospilia, and en route to Paliokastro, you will find an archaeological site preserving ancient Mycenaean monuments. One of the largest of its kind, this site is home to numerous Mycenaean tombs of important Mycenaean historical figures. They are very large in comparison to other Mycenaean tombs found in other locations around Greece and occupy a beautiful location with a panoramic view over the Alfios valley. Although not yet uncovered, logic has it that in close proximity to this relatively large in size "ancient cemetery", there must be a significant ancient Mycenaean settlement. Home to important leaders and/ or kings, it is certain that the ruins of an ancient Mycenaean civilization exist in the area.

See also
List of settlements in Arcadia

References

External links
History and Information about Kato Rizospilia
Kato Rizospilia on the GTP Travel Pages

Populated places in Arcadia, Peloponnese